are a Japanese football club based in Yoshinogawa, Tokushima.  They currently play in the Shikoku Soccer League, which part of Japanese Regional Leagues.

History
The club was founded on 2003 as Celeste FC. It didn't take long for the club to gain promotion to the Tokushima Prefectural League 1st division, this occured in 2006. Since then, the club never went back to the 2nd division. On 2012, after winning the Tokushima Prefectural League, FC Tokushima qualified to the Shikoku Prefectural League Final Tournament, facing the other 3 prefectural championships winners of Ehime, Kochi, and Kagawa, as the four prefectures comprises the Shikoku region. The club won the tournament, therefore, getting promoted to the Shikoku Soccer League. 

In 2013, their unsuccessful debut at the regional league level, led the club to get relegated back to the Tokushima Prefectural League. As quick it took to get relegated, they got promoted back to the Shikoku League for the 2016 season. From 2016 onwards, the club never again got relegated, and won qualification to the Emperor's Cup as Tokushima representatives every year since then.  

The club had two previous opportunities to play in the Regional Champions League, a tournament that can potentially give an opportunity for Regional League clubs to get promoted to the Japan Football League. Debuting at the competition in 2019, the club finished as the second-bottom club in an overall ranking, as they lost all the three matches in which they played on the first stage.  

FC Tokushima won the 2020 Shikoku Soccer League, giving them the right to participate for their second time in the competition. However, the 2020 season of the Regional Champions League was cancelled due to the COVID-19 pandemic, then, delaying their second appearance at the competition, which would happen on the 2021. In this edition, they qualified from the first stage, going through unbeaten after three matches, winning two matches and drawing the other game. However, in the second and final stage of the competition, they finished as the bottom-placed team of the group, losing all three matches, ending up as the competition's 4th-placed team.  The club made a third appearance at the competition as Shikoku representatives in 2022, as they won the Shikoku Soccer League for the second time in 2022.

Current squad

Coaching staff

League and Cup record 

Key

Honours
Shikoku Soccer League (2): 2020, 2022
Tokushima Prefectural League 1st Division (2): 2012, 2015
Tokushima Prefectural League 2nd Division (1): 2006
Shikoku Prefectural Leagues Final Tournament (2): 2012, 2015
Tokushima Prefectural Football Championship (7): 2016, 2017, 2018, 2019, 2020, 2021, 2022

References

External links
Official Website

Football clubs in Japan
Association football clubs established in 2003
Sports teams in Tokushima Prefecture
2003 establishments in Japan